The 2021 U.S. Women's Open was the 76th U.S. Women's Open, played June 3–6, 2021 at The Olympic Club in San Francisco, California.

The U.S. Women's Open is the oldest of the five current major championships and was the second of the 2021 season. It has the largest purse in women's golf at $5.5 million.

The winner was the Philippines' Yuka Saso, who defeated Japan's Nasa Hataoka on the third hole of a sudden-death playoff after both players had tied at 280 (4 under par). In third place was American Lexi Thompson, who had held a five stroke lead just before the midway point of the final round but dropped five strokes on the back-nine, including bogeys on each of the last two holes, to miss the playoff by one stroke.

Venue

The 2021 U.S. Women's Open was played on The Olympic Club's Lake course, which had previously hosted the men's U.S. Open five times. It was the first time the tournament had been in California since 2016, when it took place at CordeValle Golf Club.

Course layout

Yardage by round

Field
The field for the U.S. Women's Open is made up of players who gain entry through qualifying events and those who are exempt from qualifying. The exemption criteria include provision for recent major champions, winners of major amateur events, and leading players in the Women's World Golf Rankings. 156 players will make up the field.

Exemptions
This list details the exemption criteria for the 2021 U.S. Women's Open and the players who qualified under them; any additional criteria under which players are exempt is indicated in parentheses.

1. Recent winners of the U.S. Women's Open (2011–2020)

Choi Na-yeon
Chun In-gee (7,15)
Ariya Jutanugarn (2,8,10,15)
Kim A-lim (2,10,15)
Brittany Lang
Lee Jeong-eun (2,15)
Inbee Park (2,9,10,15)
Park Sung-hyun (6,15)
Ryu So-yeon (5,9,15)
Michelle Wie West

2. The leading ten players, and those tying for tenth place, in the 2020 U.S. Women's Open

Moriya Jutanugarn (9,15)
Megan Khang (15)
Ko Jin-young (5,7,10,14,15)
Amy Olson (9,15)
Kaitlyn Papp (a)
Hinako Shibuno (8,15)

3. The winner of the 2020 U.S. Women's Amateur

Rose Zhang (a,13)

4. The runner-up in the 2020 U.S. Women's Amateur

Gabriela Ruffels

5. Recent winners of the ANA Inspiration (2017–2021)

Mirim Lee (10,15)
Pernilla Lindberg
Patty Tavatanakit (10,14,15)

6. Recent winners of the Women's PGA Championship (2017–2020)

Hannah Green (15)
Danielle Kang (9,10,14,15)
Kim Sei-young (9,10,14,15)

7. Recent winners of Evian Championship (2016–2019)

Anna Nordqvist (9,15)
Angela Stanford (9,10)

8. Recent winners of Women’s British Open (2016–2020)

Georgia Hall (9,10,15)
In-Kyung Kim
Sophia Popov (10,15)

9. The leading 30 players from the 2020 LPGA Race to the CME Globe final points standings

Céline Boutier (15)
Ashleigh Buhai (15)
Carlota Ciganda (15)
Austin Ernst (10,14,15)
Jodi Ewart Shadoff
Ally Ewing (10,15)
Nasa Hataoka (15)
Brooke Henderson (10,15)
Stacy Lewis (10,15)
Cheyenne Knight
Lydia Ko (10,14,15)
Nelly Korda (10,14,15)
Jennifer Kupcho (15)
Minjee Lee
Gaby López (15)
Yealimi Noh (15)
Park Hee-young
Mel Reid (10,15)
Madelene Sagström (15)
Jennifer Song (15)
Thidapa Suwannapura

10. Winners of official LPGA Tour events from the originally scheduled date of the 2020 U.S. Women's Open to the start of the 2021 tournament

Hsu Wei-Ling
Kim Hyo-joo (15)
Jessica Korda (14,15)

11. The winner of the 2021 Augusta National Women's Amateur

Tsubasa Kajitani (a)

12. The winner of the 2020 Womens Amateur Championship

Aline Krauter (a)

13. The winner of the Mark H. McCormack Medal in 2020

14. The leading 10 players on the 2021 Race to CME Globe points standings as of April 14, 2021

Lexi Thompson (15)

15. The leading 75 players on the Women's World Golf Rankings as of April 14, 2021

Marina Alex
Brittany Altomare
Shanshan Feng
Kristen Gillman
Charley Hull
M. J. Hur
Ji Eun-hee
Lee Da-yeon
Lee Mi-hyang
Liu Yu
Nanna Koerstz Madsen
Caroline Masson
Emily Kristine Pedersen
Lizette Salas
Yuka Saso
Angel Yin
Amy Yang

Choi Hye-jin and Ryu Hae-ran did not play.

16. The leading 75 players on the Women's World Golf Rankings not otherwise exempt as of May 17, 2021

Lin Xiyu
Jenny Shin

Yuna Nishimura and Miyu Yamashita did not play.

17. The leading player from the 2020 China LPGA Tour order of merit not otherwise exempt as of  April 14, 2021

Yin Ruoning

18. The top four finishers in the 2020 South African Women's Open

Nicole Garcia
Leonie Harm
Karolin Lampert
Lee-Anne Pace

19. The leading two players from the 2020 LPGA of Korea Tour order of merit not otherwise exempt as of  April 14, 2021

20. Special exemptions

Paula Creamer
Cristie Kerr

Qualifying
The championship is open to any female professional or amateur golfer with a USGA or World Handicap System index not exceeding 2.4. Players may qualify by competing in tournaments of over 36 holes held between April 21, 2021 and May 13, 2021 at 22 designated sites. The following table details the players who qualified.

Alternates who gained entry
The following players gained a place in the field having finished as the leading alternates in the specified final qualifying events:
Addie Baggarly (a, Ormond Beach)
Cheng Ssu-Chia (Half Moon Bay)
Daniela Darquea (St. Peters)
Leigha Devine (a, Spring Lake)
Muni He (Woodburn)
Minori Nagano (a, Bradenton)
Natalie Srinivasan (Southern Pines)
Ayako Uehara (Beaumont)
Britney Yada (Westminster)

Round summaries

First round 
Thursday, June 3, 2021

Source:

Second round 
Friday, June 4, 2021

Source:

Third round 
Saturday, June 5, 2021

Source:

Final round 
Sunday, June 6, 2021

Source:

Scorecard

Cumulative tournament scores, relative to par
{| class="wikitable" span="50" style="font-size:85%;"
|-
| style="background:red;" width="10" |
| Eagle
| style="background:pink;" width="10" |
| Birdie
| style="background:palegreen;" width="10" |
| Bogey
| style="background:green;" width="10" |
| Double Bogey
|}

Playoff 

Two-hole aggregate playoff on holes 9 and 18 before a sudden-death playoff on hole 9

Scorecard 

Cumulative playoff scores, relative to par
Source:

Notes

References

External links

United States Golf Association website

U.S. Women's Open
Golf in California
Sports competitions in San Francisco
Women's sports in California
U.S. Women's Open
U.S. Women's Open
U.S. Women's Open
U.S. Women's Open